Ramak NikTalab  (/ra;'mæk , ni:k.'tæ.læb'/; born 1969) is a translator and author of Persian literature from Iran. Her specialty is in children's literature. She is a member of a NikTalab family. Some of her books are between the "A Thousand Years of the Persian Book" Series in the Library of Congress.

Biography 
Ramak NikTalab was born in 1969 in The NikTalab family in Tehran. Her father is Ahmad NikTalab (Was an Iranian poet) and her mother is Farkhondeh Mahmoodi (is an artist from Iran). Babak and Poopak are her siblings.

Ramak graduated from Tehran University with a degree in English literature and then studied Public administration. Ramak started writing and translating since she was a teenager. She is one of the first members of the Iranian Children and Adolescent Writers Association (Nevisak). She is the first person who translated the novels of Peter Pan and Sara Crewe into Persian language. She is the author of the stories of two Iranian national characters named Dara and Sara. From these fictional characters, dolls with the same name were made, wearing different clothes of Iranian tribes.

She seriously and professionally entered the field of translation and writing for children and teenagers since 1990, and her first book was the 6-volume collection "Sam Firefighter".

The Voyages of Dara and Sara in Iran 
Some of her books (It called: The Voyages of Dara and Sara in Iran) are between the "A Thousand Years of the Persian Book" Series in the Library of Congress.

Selected works

Compilations 

 Tales for the first grade (In Persian: قصه هایی برای کلاس اولی), Zaytoun Publishing
 Teacher, gardener of kindness: a collection of poems for teenagers (In Persian:معلم، باغبان مهربانی: مجموعه شعر برای نوجوانان); with Babak NikTalab, Paknevis Publications
 Mother, an angel of kindness: a collection of poems for teenagers (In Persian:مادر، فرشته مهربانی: مجموعه شعر برای نوجوانان); with Babak NikTalab, Paknevis Publications
 The author's status in Russia (In Persian: وضعیت نویسنده در روسیه), Journal of fiction literature

The collection of Dara and Sarah's travels 

 Dara & Sara in Kerman (In Persian: دارا و سارا در کرمان), Institute for the Intellectual Development of Children and Young Adults
 Dara & Sara in Hamedan (In Persian: دارا و سارا در همدان), Institute for the Intellectual Development of Children and Young Adults
 Dara & Sara in Fars (In Persian: دارا و سارا در فارس), Institute for the Intellectual Development of Children and Young Adults
 Dara & Sara in Khorasan (In Persian: دارا و سارا در خراسان), Institute for the Intellectual Development of Children and Young Adults

Translations 

 Sara Crewe, Qadiani Publications Institute; ISBN 9789644175909
 Little princess (Pocket classics), Qadiani Publications Institute; ISBN 9786002511003
 Sara Crewe (classic novel); Qadiani Publications Institute; ISBN 9780000677204
 Peter Pan, Qadiani Publications Institute, ISBN 9789645365231
 I am angry, Qadiani Publications Institute, Banafsheh Books
 The story of my journey to Alpha, Mihrab Qalam publishing, ISBN 9786001038693
 Sam's colored balloons, Noor al-Saghalin Publications, Fakher
 Ponti Pandi's White Christmas, Noor al-Saghalin Publishing House, Fakher
 Cat theft, Noor al-Saghalin publishing house; Fakher
 Troubled Tour, Noor Al-Saghalin Publications; Fakher
 The big race; Noor al-Saghlain Publications, Fakher
 Real auction; Noor al-Saghlain Publications, Fakher

References 

Iranian literary scholars
Living people
1969 births
Iranian children's writers
Children's poets
Persian-language poets
Writers of young adult literature
Women writers of young adult literature
21st-century Iranian poets
NikTalab family
21st-century Iranian women writers
Literary scholars